May We Borrow Your Husband? and Other Comedies of the Sexual Life  is a collection of short stories by British writer Graham Greene, first published in 1967. As the title suggests, this collection of twelve stories belongs to what Greene himself often described as entertainments. The stories are quite diverse, ranging as they do in gender, location and era and in genre, from farce to melodrama to tragedy and occasionally all of those genres at once.

Stories
 May We Borrow Your Husband?
 Beauty
 Chagrin in Three Parts
 The Over-night Bag
 Mortmain
 Cheap in August
 A Shocking Accident
 The Invisible Japanese Gentlemen
 Awful When You Think of It
 Doctor Crombie
 The Root of All Evil
 Two Gentle People

References

Books by Graham Greene
1967 short story collections
The Bodley Head books
British short story collections